WantItAll.co.za is an online shop based in Johannesburg, South Africa that sells over 14 million products. Founded in 2006 by Justin Drennan, Ryan Drennan and Terence Murphy, the company received venture capital and investment from entrepreneurs David Frankel (entrepreneur) and Ronnie Apteker. WantItAll is ranked as the third largest web store in South Africa in terms of sales and the second largest in terms of visitors as per Alexa Internet rankings, with 200 000 customers and over 150 000 products shipped from the US to South Africa.

International expansion
With the backing of angel investors, WantItAll.co.za has expanded into the Brazilian market with CompreUS.com, which translates to "Buy US" in Portuguese.

South African expansion
In April 2013, Wantitall invested in online design retailer Citymob.co.za, allowing Citymob to upscale and increase its product offering, as it will have a better distribution system. Subsequent to the investment, citymob was rebranded to superbalist.com

In November 2014 Wantitall launched an outsourced warehouse and logistics business parcelninja.co.za, which attracted R20M investment from C5 Holdings in the United Kingdom.

Walmart connection
WantItAll.co.za has been tasked to operate and manage the online shop for South Africa's largest cash and carry (sales) distributor Makro, called Makroshop.co.za. Makro in South Africa is part of Massmart which has just been acquired by the world's largest public corporation by revenue Walmart.

In 2014, Walmart partnered with wantitall.co.za to develop makro.co.za

Amazon
WantItAll formed a strategic partnership with Amazon.com to stock their entire product catalogue partly because Amazon "blacklisted" the South African Post Office for deliveries.

References

External links
WantItAll.co.za
South African Post Office blacklisted by Amazon.com
Amazon halts Post Office deliveries
SAPO hit by rise in mail theft
WantItAll geared to improve SA music industry
Making an online buck or two
Christmas cheer for online retailers as sales soar
Justin Drennan, WantItAll founder: 300 Young South Africans: Technology
Online Shopping Goes South American
Wantitall summary (web ranking, servers and earnings)
Superbalist.com

Online retailers of South Africa
Amazon (company)
Internet properties established in 2006
Companies based in Johannesburg